Code Blue may refer to:
 Code Blue (emergency code), a hospital code used to indicate a patient requiring immediate resuscitation
 Code Blue (film), a 2011 Dutch film by Urszula Antoniak
 Code Blue (TV series), a Japanese drama series
 Code Blue (album), a 1990 album by Icehouse
 Code Blue (bull), #644, a world champion bucking bull
 Code Blue – Emergency, a 1987 science fiction novel by James White
 Code: Blue, a fictional organization in the Marvel Universe
"Code Blue", a song by T.S.O.L. from Dance with Me

See also
 Blue Code of Silence or blue wall of silence, a purported rule among police not to report on colleagues' misconduct